Foakaidhoo Football Club, is a Maldivian football club in Foakaidhoo (Shaviyani Atoll), that competes in the Dhivehi Premier League, the highest tier of Maldivian football.

History
Foakaidhoo played first division football during the mid 2000s, before getting relegated.

Players

Current squad

Management team

References

External links
 

Football clubs in the Maldives
Dhivehi Premier League clubs